Eumathes canus is a species of beetle in the family Cerambycidae. It was described by Ernst Friedrich Germar in 1824. It is known from Brazil.

References

Calliini
Beetles described in 1824
Insects of Brazil
Beetles of South America